An election was held on 26 May 2019 to elect six representatives from Cyprus to the European Parliament.

The Democratic Rally (DISY) has won every election to the European Parliament since Cyprus joined the European Union in 2004. 

According to final results, DISY again won the election with 29% and 2 seats. There were no changes in seat allocation, with AKEL also at 2 seats after securing 27% of the vote. DIKO and EDEK had 1 seat each, with 14% and 11% of the vote, respectively.

In terms of percentage, this was EDEK's best European elections result since 2004 (although that year it did not win any seats). Some attributed this in part to tactical voting, with many fearing the far-right ELAM gaining a seat had it finished fourth.

Opinion polls

Results

References

European Parliament elections in Cyprus
2019 in Cyprus
2010s in Cypriot politics
Cyprus